Regina Orozco (born 18 February 1964; Mexico City, Mexico) is a Mexican actress and singer, best known for her roles in Mexican films. Orozco won an Ariel Award for Best Actress for her performance in the film Profundo Carmesí (1996). Subsequently, she was nominated at the Venice International Film Festival for Best Actress for her performance in Profundo Carmesí. In March 2013, she won the Medal of Merit in Artistic Interpretation, awarded by the Legislative Assembly of the Federal District by the VI Legislature.

Filmography

Film roles

Television roles

Personal life
Orozco is openly pansexual.

References

External links 
 

1964 births
Living people
Mexican film actresses
Mexican television actresses
21st-century Mexican actresses
Pansexual entertainers